Black was originally formed in Dhaka, Bangladesh by vocalist Jon, guitarist Jahan & drummer Tony. The band is the first Alternative rock band of Bangladesh.
Black is mostly known for their music style, composition and lyrics. Black started to gain popularity after they released their first song Chenna Dukkho in a 2000 compilation album, Charpotro.

After their successful track Chenna Dukkho they went on to release two more singles from the compilation album Anushilon. Which also earned the attentions of rock music listeners of Bangladesh. 
In 2002 Black would release their debut record titled Amar Prithibi. Work began on the album in fall of 2001, between which they had also released several other singles in various compilation albums, and came into completion fall of 2002.
The album became commercially successful. Black stepped into the studio once more to start recording for their follow up album titled Utshober Por. Notably the tracks, "Utshober Por" (title track) and "Shloak" received frequent radio airplays.

On April 20, 2005, Black was returning home after the completion of a Tour in Chittagong, when their bus crashed near a ditch on the road. The crash caused the death of Imran Ahmed Choudhury Mobin, a sound engineer of the music industry of Bangladesh and a close friend of the band. Jon, Jahan and Tahsan suffered minor injuries while Miraz and Tony had to be hospitalized immediately. 
The members of the band announced a hiatus until further notice. Miraz had been diagnosed with a permanently damaged patella and had to leave the band indefinitely.

Although the band was inactive for a while, they were still releasing singles through compilation albums. After a five-year break the band announced their official comeback with the release of their third studio album titled Abar which was released in 2008.
Black released their self-titled fourth studio album on August 21, 2011.

Studio albums

Compilation albums
 2000: Charpotro
 2001: Anushilon
 2002: Projonmo
 2003: Din Bodol, Agontuk
 2004: Lokayot,  Agontuk 2, Shopnochura, Offbeat (Teleplay Soundtrack)
 2005: Agontuk 3
 2006: Shopnochura 2, Underground
 2007: Shopnochura 3, Live Now
 2008: Rock 101
 2009: Rock 202
 2010: Rock 505
 2011: Cholo Bangladesh, Rock 606
 2012: Hatiar

Singles

Music videos

References

External links
 Official Facebook Page
 Official Youtube Channel

Rock music group discographies
Discographies of Bangladeshi artists